Joey Wadding is a Gaelic footballer from County Wexford, Ireland. He plays with the Wexford inter-county team.

References

Year of birth missing (living people)
Living people
Wexford inter-county Gaelic footballers